Glory of Russia Cape is the northernmost point of St. Matthew Island in the Bering Sea in the US state of Alaska.

All of St. Matthew Island lies under the management control of the Alaska Maritime National Wildlife Refuge, an area of significant phytogeographic interest for its diverse lichens. It is part of a bird sanctuary, which was established in February 1909 and is known as the Bering Sea Reservation. The hills of the isolated island rise to about  height and are covered with moss and lichen. Little auks (Alle alle), birds usually found in the North Atlantic, were sighted in auklet colonies near the Glory of Russia Cape from 12 to 24 June 1983.

The cape was named by Russian polar explorer and hydrographer Gavril Sarychev in honor of the ship Glory of Russia. The cape, a promontory, was probably also named “M[ys] Slavy (Slava) Rossii” meaning “Cape Glory of Russia” by the Russian Hydrographic Department (Chart 1427) in 1849 for Lt. Sarichev’s ship, which was moored here on 14 July 1791.

The 8,105-ton Greek ship Milos Reefer,  in length, was wrecked at Glory of Russia Cape on 15 November 1989.

References

Further reading
Сарычев Г. А. Плавание к острову Святого Лаврентия // Путешествие флота капитана Сарычева по Северо-Восточной части Сибири, Ледовитому морю и Восточному океану в продолжение осьми лет, при Географической и Астрономической морской Экспедиции, бывшей под начальством флота Капитана Биллингса с 1785 по 1793 год.. — St. Petersburg: Типография Шиора, 1809. — Vol. 2. — pp. 87–88. (in Russian)
Слава России в словаре «Топонимика. Города и страны» 

Headlands of Alaska
Landforms of Bethel Census Area, Alaska